This is a list of hospitals in Serbia.

Organization
As of January 2016, there were 306 public healthcare institutions in Serbia, operated by the Ministry of Health of Serbia. The ministry classifies hospitals into five categories:
 Healthcare center – 151 healthcare centers, providing primary healthcare to the most of the municipalities and cities;
 General Hospital or Health Center – 42 general hospitals, providing secondary healthcare to the districts; a total of 15,917 beds available as of 2017;
 Clinical Hospital Center – 6 clinical hospital centers, providing secondary and tertiary healthcare, two based in Kosovo and Metohija and four based in the capital city of Belgrade; a total of 5,357 beds available;
 Clinical Center – 4 major medical centers, based in four largest university centers; a total of 7,218 beds available;
 Specialized Institutions – 7 specialized clinics, 61 institutes (of which 23 specialized for public health), 33 special hospitals (rehabilitation hospitals, lung diseases, psychiatric diseases and other), 2 military hospitals of which Military Medical Academy (VMA) is financed and controlled by the Ministry of Defence of Serbia.

Also, the Ministry of Health of Serbia operates with 36 pharmacy institutions, which have hundreds of marketplaces in municipalities and cities of Serbia.

Primary healthcare hospitals

Secondary healthcare hospitals

Tertiary healthcare hospitals

Other institutions

Clinics

Institutes

Institutes for Public Health

Military Hospitals

Special Hospitals

See also
 Health in Serbia
 Healthcare in Serbia

References

External links
 Serbia Report at who.int
 Uredba o planu mreže zdravstvenih ustanova at paragraf.rs 

Hospitals
Serbia
Hospitals
Serbia